Association Malienne des Droits de l'Homme (AMDH) is a Malian non-profit human rights non-governmental organization founded in Bamako, Mali on 11 December 1988.

Leadership
Moustapha Cisse was President of the AMDH in 2006. , Moctat Mariko holds the role of President.

AMDH is a member of International Federation for Human Rights (FIDH).

Human rights activities
In October 2005, AMDH organised a debate in Bamako about the death penalty.

In December 2012, during the Northern Mali conflict that started in January 2012, the AMDH together with the FIDH published a detailed report of human rights abuses that had occurred, referring to evidence of a rape campaign in Gao and Timbuktu after their takeover by the National Movement for the Liberation of Azawad (MNLA), recruitment of 12- to 15-year-old children as child soldiers by Ansar Dine, and the extrajudicial execution of 153 Malian soldiers by the MNLA and Ansar Dine on 24 January 2012.

References

External links
 An entry at justicemali.org 

Human rights organisations based in Mali
Organizations established in 1988
International Federation for Human Rights member organizations